This is a list of writings published by Carl Jung. Many of Jung's most important works have been collected, translated, and published in a 20-volume set by Princeton University Press, entitled The Collected Works of C. G. Jung. Works here are arranged by original publication date if known.

Works 
1902–1905. Psychiatric Studies. The Collected Works of C. G. Jung Vol. 1. 1953, edited by Michael Fordham. London: Routledge & Kegan Paul / Princeton, NJ: Bollingen. (This was the first of 18 volumes plus separate bibliography and index. Not including revisions, the set was completed in 1967.)
1903. "On the Psychology and Pathology of So-Called Occult Phenomena" ["Zur Psychologie und Pathologie sogenannter occulter Phanomene."] His doctoral dissertation.
1904–1907. Studies in Word Association. London: Routledge & K. Paul. (contained in Experimental Researches, CW 2)
1907. The Psychology of Dementia Praecox (1st ed.). New York: Nervous and Mental Disease Publ. Co. (Contained in The Psychogenesis of Mental Disease, CW 3.) This is the disease now known as schizophrenia.
1907–1958. The Psychogenesis of Mental Disease. London: Routledge. (Collected Works Vol. 3, 1991 ed.)
1910. About the conflicts of a child's soul, Rascher Verlag, Leipzig
1912. Psychology of the Unconscious: a study of the transformations and symbolisms of the libido, a contribution to the history of the evolution of thought, translated by B. M. Hinkle, 1916. London: Kegan Paul Trench Trubner. (Revised in 1952 as Symbols of Transformation.)
1917. Collected Papers on Analytical Psychology (2nd ed.), with C. E. Long. London: Balliere Tindall & Cox. (contained in Freud and Psychoanalysis, CW 4)
1917, 1928. Two Essays on Analytical Psychology (1st ed). London: Routledge. (Revised in 1966, CW 7.)
1921. Psychological Types, or, The Psychology of Individuation, with H. G. Baynes London: Kegan Paul Trench Trubner. (Collected Works Vol.6 )
1928. Contributions to Analytical Psychology, H. G. Baynes and C. F. Baynes. London: Routledge & Kegan Paul.
1932. The Psychology of Kundalini Yoga: notes of a seminar by C.G. Jung, with S. Shamdasani. 1996 ed. Princeton, N.J.: Princeton University Press.
1933. Modern Man in Search of a Soul. London: Kegan Paul Trench Trubner, (1955 ed. Harvest Books )
1934–1954. The Archetypes and the Collective Unconscious. (1981 2nd ed. Collected Works Vol.9 Part 1), Princeton, N.J.: Bollingen. 
1936. The Psychology of Dementia Praecox (2nd ed.).
1938. Psychology and Religion The Terry Lectures. New Haven: Yale University Press. (contained in Psychology and Religion: West and East Collected Works Vol. 11 ).
1940. The Integration of the Personality, with S. M. Dell. London: Routledge and Kegan Paul.
1944. Psychology and Alchemy (2nd ed. 1968 Collected Works Vol. 12 ). London: Routledge.
1947. Essays on Contemporary Events. London: Kegan Paul.
1947. On the Nature of the Psyche (revised in 1954). London: Ark Paperbacks. (1988 ed. contained in Collected Works Vol. 8).
1949. "Foreword." Pp. xxi-xxxix (19 pages) In The I Ching or Book of Changes, Wilhelm/Baynes translation, Bollingen Edition 19. Princeton University Press.(contained in CW 11).
1951. Aion: Researches into the Phenomenology of the Self, Collected Works Vol. 9 Part 2. Princeton, N.J.: Bollingen. 
1952. Synchronicity: An Acausal Connecting Principle (1st ed.). Princeton, NJ: Princeton University Press,  (contained in CW 8)
1952. Symbols of Transformation, Collected Works Vol. 5. (A revision of Psychology of the Unconscious, 1912.) .
1952. Answer to Job. 1958 Princeton, N.J.: Princeton University Press (contained in Collected Works Vol. 11)
1956. Mysterium Coniunctionis: An Inquiry into the Separation and Synthesis of Psychic Opposites in Alchemy (1st ed.). London: Routledge. This was Jung's last book length work, completed when he was eighty.
1957. "The Undiscovered Self (Present and Future)". 50-page essay, also contained in CW 10.
New York: American Library, 1959.
New York: Bollingen, 1990: .
1958. Psyche and Symbol: A Selection from the Writings of C.G. Jung, edited by V. S. De Laszlo. Garden City, NY: Doubleday.
1959. Flying Saucers: A Modern Myth of Things Seen in the Skies. London: Routledge & Paul, [1959].
1959. Basic Writings, edited by V. S. De Laszlo. New York: Modern Library.
1962. Memories, Dreams, Reflections [autobiography], recorded and edited by Aniela Jaffé. London: Collins. .
1964. Conversations with Carl Jung and Reactions from Ernest Jones, with Ernest Jones, edited by R. I. Evans. New York: Van Nostrand.
1964. Man and His Symbols, with Marie-Louise von Franz. Garden City, N.Y.: Doubleday, 
1966. The Practice of Psychotherapy: Essays on the Psychology of the Transference and other Subjects (Collected Works Vol. 16). Princeton, NJ: Princeton University Press.
1966. Two Essays on Analytical Psychology (revised, 2nd ed.), Collected Works Vol. 7. London: Routledge.
1967. The Development of Personality, Collected Works Vol. 17 .
1968. Analytical Psychology: Its Theory and Practise (a.k.a. "The Tavistock Lectures")
1970. Four Archetypes; Mother, Rebirth, Spirit, Trickster. Princeton, N.J.: Princeton University Press. (contained in CW 9 part 1)
1970. Mysterium Coniunctionis (2nd ed.), Collected Works Vol. 14. London: Routledge. .
1973. Synchronicity: An Acausal Connecting Principle (2nd ed.). Princeton, NJ: Princeton University Press. .
1974. Dreams. Princeton, NJ: Princeton University Press (compilation from Collected Works Vols. 4, 8, 12, 16), 
[1917] 1974. The Freud/Jung Letters: The Correspondence between Sigmund Freud and C. G. Jung, translated by R. F. C. Hull and Ralph Mannheim, edited and with an introduction by William McGuire.
1976. The Portable Jung [compilation], edited by J. Campbell. New York: Penguin Books. 
1978. Abstracts of the Collected Works of C.G. Jung, edited by C. L. Rothgeb, S. M. Clemens, and National Clearinghouse for Mental Health Information. Washington, DC: U.S. Govt. Printing Office.
1983. The Essential Jung [compilation], edited by Anthony Storr. Princeton, NJ: Princeton University Press, 
1986. Psychology and the East. London: Ark. (contained in CW 11)
1987. Dictionary of Analytical Psychology. London: Ark Paperbacks.
1988. Psychology and Western Religion. London: Ark Paperbacks. (contained in CW 11)
1990. The World Within: C.G. Jung in his own words [video recording], with S. Wagner, G. Wagner, and L. Van der Post. New York, NY: Kino International / Insight Media.
1991. Psychological Types (revised ed.), translated by R. F. C. Hull. London: Routledge.
1997. Jung on Active Imagination, edited by J. Chodorow. Princeton, N.J.: Princeton University Press.
1998. Jung's Seminar on Nietzsche's Zarathustra (abridged ed.), edited by J. L. Jarrett. Princeton, NJ: Princeton University Press.
2001. Atom and Archetype: The Pauli/Jung Letters, 1932-1958, with Wolfgang Pauli, edited by C. A. Meier. Princeton, NJ: Princeton University Press. .
2007. The Jung-White Letters, with Victor White. Philemon Series.
2007. Children’s Dreams. Philemon Series.
2009. The Red Book. Liber Novus, edited by Sonu Shamdasani. Philemon Series & W. W. Norton & Co. 
2011. The Jung-Kirsch Letters: The Correspondence of C.G. Jung and James Kirsch, with James Kirsch, edited by Ann Conrad Lammers. Routledge. .
2013. The Question of Psychological Types. Philemon Series & Princeton University Press.
2014. Atom and Archetype: The Pauli/Jung Letters, 1932–1958, Jung, C. G. and Pauli, Wolfgang. ed. Meier, C. A.; Zabriskie, Beverley and Roscoe, David. 2014-07-01. Princeton University Press. .
2014. Dream Interpretation Ancient and Modern. Philemon Series & Princeton University Press.
2015. The Solar Myths and Opicinus de Canistris: Notes of the Seminar given at Eranos in 1943. Daimon. 
2015. The Jung & Neumann Correspondence. Philemon Series & Princeton University Press.
2015. Notes from C. G. Jung's Lecture on Gérard de Nerval's "Aurélia". Philemon Series & Princeton University Press.
2018. History of Modern Psychology: Lectures Delivered at the ETH Zurich, Volume 1: 1933-1934. Philemon Series & Princeton University Press.
2018. The Art of C. G. Jung, W. W. Norton & The Foundation of the Works of C.G. Jung.
2019. Dream Symbols of the Individuation Process. Notes of C. G. Jung's Seminars on Wolfgang Pauli's Dreams, Philemon Series & Princeton University Press.
2020. On Theology and Psychology: The Correspondence of C. G. Jung and Adolf Keller, Philemon Series & Princeton University Press.
2020. The Black Books, edited by Sonu Shamdasani. Philemon Series & W. W. Norton & Co. 
2021. Psychology of Yoga and Meditation: Lectures Delivered at ETH Zurich, Volume 6: 1938–1940. Philemon Series & Princeton University Press.
2022. Consciousness and the Unconscious: Lectures Delivered at ETH Zurich, Volume 2: 1934. Philemon Series & Princeton University Press.
2023. Jung on Ignatius of Loyola’s Spiritual Exercises: Lectures Delivered at ETH Zurich, Volume 7: 1939–1940. Philemon Series & Princeton University Press.

External links

Abstracts of the Collected Works of C.G. Jung

Bibliographies of Swiss writers
Psychology bibliographies